Sultan Abdul Samad Mausoleum is a royal mausoleum located in Bukit Jugra in Jugra, Selangor, Malaysia. Since 1886, it has served as the final resting place for several members of the Selangor royal family.

Graves/Tombs

Sultans
 Sultan Abdul Samad (died 1898)

Tengku Ampuan/Tengku Pemaisuri graves (Graves of Royal Consorts)
Tunku Maharum binti Al-Marhum Tunku Ziauddin (died 1908) - Tengku Ampuan of Selangor 1898 - Tengku Ampuan Paduka Sri Negara 1903

Royal family members
 Raja Muda Raja Musa (died 7 July 1884) - Raja Muda (Crown Prince) of Selangor
 Raja Tipah 
 Raja Munah
 Raja Abu Nusah (died 1927)
 Raja Arfah  (died 26 September 1896) Raja Yaakub - Tengku Alang Raja Muteh
 Raja Nong Shah
 Raja Mahmud
 Raja Daud
 Raja Abdul Kahar - Penghulu of Ulu Langat 
 Raja Alfah                     
 Cik Puan Hasnah[Aminah] binti Pilong Makam Bandar- wife of Sultan Sulaiman of Selangor and mother of Sultan Hisammuddin of Selangor
Tengku Badar Shah - Raja Bendahara of Selangor (died 30 October 1945)''

References

Kuala Langat District
Mausoleums in Selangor